Andreas Pfingstner (born 24 March 1993) is an Austrian footballer who currently plays for SV Allerheiligen.

External links
 
 

1993 births
Living people
Austrian footballers
SC Wiener Neustadt players
SK Sturm Graz players
Association football defenders